"Esse Cara Sou Eu" is an extended play (EP) released by Brazilian singer Roberto Carlos in 2012. The EP has sold over 1.7 million copies in Brazil.

Among the four present tracks, two are new: the title track, a romantic ballad, "Furdúncio", a funk melody written in partnership with Erasmo Carlos. Both tracks were included on the soundtrack of the Rede Globo's telenovela Salve Jorge  in 2012.

The CD version includes the song "A Volta", re-recording an old success of Os Vips, composed by Roberto to the duo in 1966, which was included on the soundtrack of the Globo's telenovela América. The song "A Mulher Que Eu Amo" was featured in the telenovela Viver a Vida broadcast by the same station in 2009. The title track won the Latin Grammy Award for Best Brazilian Song and received a nomination for Song of the Year at the 14th awards ceremony in 2013.

In 2014, a Spanish-language version of the EP, Ese Tipo Soy Yo, was released targeting the Latin American market.

Track listing

Charts

Certifications

References

2012 EPs
Roberto Carlos (singer) EPs
Portuguese-language EPs
Sony Music Brazil EPs